The Mandrake is a death metal band who were signed to Crash Music but now describe themselves as looking for a new label, and they are releasing their next EP independently. They have released one demo and one studio album.

The Mandrake is, according to their record label, an example of an American band with a lot of Scandinavian influences from the likes of Age of Ruin, Opeth and At the Gates; Scandinavia having dominated the black and death metal scene throughout the 1990s. The band achieved early success, garnering favorable reviews even in the demo stage. Slight touches of black metal are often present in some of their work. While at the demo stage, they opened for international bands including Six Feet Under, Fear Factory and Behemoth.

History
The Mandrake was founded in early 2001 by their guitarist, Ron, and they released their first demo, Dying Sentiment, later that year. Their second album, The Burning Horizon at the End of Dawn, was released on Crash Music. The album was released in 2004 worldwide and was subject to more widespread reviews. The band started a large tour on April 7, 2008.

Discography
Dying Sentiment (demo) (2001)
Burning Horizon at the End of Dawn (2004)

References

External links
The Mandrake on Myspace
The Mandrake at Rate Your Music
The Mandrake at Spirit of Metal
The Burning Horizon review at Deathgrind (German)
2003 interview from Metal Side
Thomas, Erik (2004) "The Mandrake - Burning Horizon at the End of Dawn review", Teeth of the Divine
The Burning Horizon at the End of Dawn review at Metal Review
Dead Tide review

American death metal musical groups
Heavy metal musical groups from Colorado
Musical groups established in 2001
Musical quintets